Manuel Roa (2 April 1929 – 18 December 2017) was a Chilean footballer.  He competed in the men's tournament at the 1952 Summer Olympics.

References

External links
 
 

1929 births
2017 deaths
Chilean footballers
Chile international footballers
Olympic footballers of Chile
Footballers at the 1952 Summer Olympics
Place of birth missing
Association football goalkeepers
Naval de Talcahuano footballers